Yannick Clemens Thomas Wetzell (born 8 July 1996) is a New Zealand professional basketball player for Alba Berlin of the Basketball Bundesliga and EuroLeague. He played college basketball for the St. Mary's Rattlers, the Vanderbilt Commodores, and the San Diego State Aztecs.

Early life and high school career
Wetzell grew up in Auckland, New Zealand. At the age of eight, he played soccer alongside later San Diego State goaltender Cameron Hogg. Wetzell decided to focus on tennis at the age of 13 and achieved a junior national ranking. He attended Westlake Boys High School in Auckland. As a senior in high school, he began playing basketball due to a growth spurt. Wetzell helped lead his team to the 2014 final of the Secondary Schools National Championships, losing to Otago Boys High School. Wetzell did not receive any collegiate offers, so he used an international recruiting agency to connect him to Division II St. Mary's.

College career
As a freshman at St. Mary's, Wetzell averaged 11.7 and 5.6 rebounds per game. He was named Heartland Conference Freshman of the Year. Wetzell averaged 15.5 points and 6.8 rebounds per game as a sophomore. He was named to the Second Team All-Heartland Conference. Following the season, he transferred to Vanderbilt, choosing the Commodores over Purdue, Baylor, and Texas, and sat out a season per NCAA regulations.

As a junior at Vanderbilt, Wetzell made 10 starts and averaged 5.9 points and 3.8 rebounds per game, shooting 49.6 percent from the floor. He was a SEC Academic Honor Roll honoree and earned a degree in economics. The Commodores finished 0–18 in SEC play and coach Bryce Drew was fired. Wetzell contacted Saint Mary's assistant coach Bubba Meyer to request advice about a graduate transfer. San Diego State coach Brian Dutcher was informed, and after taking an official visit Wetzell chose the Aztecs over an offer from Texas Tech. He helped replace Jalen McDaniels, who left early to play professionally. Wetzell averaged 11.6 points, 6.5 rebounds and 1.3 assists per game as a senior, and his 59.2% field goal percentage is ninth-highest in Aztec single-season history. He was named to the Second Team All-Mountain West.

Professional career

South East Melbourne Phoenix (2020–2021)
On 28 July 2020, Wetzell signed his first professional contract with South East Melbourne Phoenix of the National Basketball League. On 16 August 2020, Wetzell exercised the European out clause in his contract and was released by the Phoenix. He signed with Riesen Ludwigsburg of the German Basketball Bundesliga on 19 August, but rejoined the Phoenix on 14 October after experiencing passport complications with his move to Europe. Wetzell averaged 11.2 points and 6.0 rebounds per game.

New Zealand Breakers (2021–2022)
On 2 July 2021, Wetzell signed a three-year deal with the New Zealand Breakers. He was released from the remainder of his contract on 15 April 2022 under mutual consent. Across 22 games, Wetzell averaged 17.7 points and 8.2 rebounds per game for the Breakers.

Saski Baskonia (2022) 
On 15 April 2022, Wetzell signed with Saski Baskonia of the Liga ACB until the end of the 2022–23 season.

Alba Berlin (2022–present)
On July 26, 2022, he has signed with Alba Berlin of the Basketball Bundesliga.

National team career
In 2017, Wetzell was named to the New Zealand Select Team that played in a tournament in China. He has also competed for the New Zealand U19 Team, also known as the Tall Blacks.

Career statistics

College

NCAA Division I

|-
| style="text-align:left;"| 2017–18
| style="text-align:left;"| Vanderbilt
| style="text-align:center;" colspan="11"|  Redshirt
|-
| style="text-align:left;"| 2018–19
| style="text-align:left;"| Vanderbilt
| 32 || 10 || 18.5 || .496 || .265 || .763 || 3.8 || .3 || .7 || .6 || 5.9
|-
| style="text-align:left;"| 2019–20
| style="text-align:left;"| San Diego State
| 32 || 32 || 27.8 || .592 || .318 || .642 || 6.5 || 1.3 || .8 || .6 || 11.6
|- class="sortbottom"
| style="text-align:center;" colspan="2"| Career
| 64 || 42 || 23.2 || .559 || .286 || .688 || 5.2 || .8 || .7 || .6 || 8.8

NCAA Division II

|-
| style="text-align:left;"| 2015–16
| style="text-align:left;"| St. Mary's
| 29 || 29 || 25.1 || .530 || .500 || .632 || 5.6 || .9 || .3 || .3 || 11.7
|-
| style="text-align:left;"| 2016–17
| style="text-align:left;"| St. Mary's
| 30 || 30 || 31.3 || .501 || .409 || .667 || 6.8 || 1.5 || .8 || .6 || 15.5
|- class="sortbottom"
| style="text-align:center;" colspan="2"| Career
| 59 || 59 || 28.3 || .514 || .420 || .654 || 6.2 || 1.2 || .6 || .4 || 13.6

Personal life
Wetzell is the son of Jenny and Clem Wetzell, who travelled to see him play 12 games at San Diego State. He is the younger brother of television journalist and presenter Pippa Wetzell.

References

External links
NBL profile
Basketball-Reference.com profile
San Diego State Aztecs bio
Vanderbilt Commodores bio
St. Mary's Rattlers bio

1996 births
Living people
Alba Berlin players
Basketball players from Auckland
Centers (basketball)
New Zealand Breakers players
New Zealand expatriate basketball people in the United States
New Zealand men's basketball players
Power forwards (basketball)
San Diego State Aztecs men's basketball players
South East Melbourne Phoenix players
St. Mary's Rattlers men's basketball players
Vanderbilt Commodores men's basketball players